List of Serbs of Montenegro.

Monarch
 Peter of Diokleia
 Stefan Vojislav
 Jovan Vladimir
 Mihailo Vojislavljević
 Constantine Bodin
 Miroslav of Hum
 Stefan Nemanja
 Vukan Nemanjić
 Stefan Vukanović Nemanjić
 Stefan the First-Crowned
 Stefan Radoslav
 Stefan Vladislav
 Jelena Balšić
 Ana Damjanović
 Stefan Štiljanović
 Stephen of Piperi
 Danilo I, Prince of Montenegro
 Nikola I Petrović-Njegoš
 Alexander I of Yugoslavia
 George, Crown Prince of Serbia

Religion
 Saint Sava
 Stefan Štiljanović
 Jevstatije I
 Arsenije III Čarnojević
 Serbian Patriarch Gavrilo V
 Varnava, Serbian Patriarch
 Danilo I, Metropolitan of Cetinje
 Sava Petrović
 Vasilije Petrović
 Arsenije Plamenac
 Petar I Petrović-Njegoš
 Petar II Petrović-Njegoš
 Ilarion Roganović
 Visarion Ljubiša
 Mitrofan Ban
 Joanikije Lipovac
 Amfilohije Radović, archbishop
 Joanikije Mićović

Military
 Grdan (fl. 1596–d. 1612), vojvoda (duke) of the Nikšić nahija, rebel against the Ottoman Empire
 Bajo Pivljanin (1630–1685), Hajduk commander in Venetian service, born in Piva
 Mlatišuma (1664–1740), Habsburg Serbian commander, born in Bjelopavlići
 Vukosav Puhalović (fl. 1665–69), Hajduk commander in Venetian service
 Grujica Žeravica (fl. 1665–69), Hajduk commander in Venetian service, born in Banjani
 Matija Zmajević (1680-1735), admiral of the Baltic Fleet and the shipbuilder of the Russian Tsar Peter the Great
 Ivan Lukačević (fl. 1711–12), Russian captain and delegate, born in Podgorica
 Jovan Albanez (fl. 1711–27), Russian major, born in Podgorica
 Marko Ivanović Vojnović (1750–1807), Admiral of the Russian Imperial Navy, one of the founders of the Black Sea Fleet.
 Tomo Milinović (1770–1846), revolutionary and writer, participant in the First Serbian Uprising
 Mašo Vrbica (1833–1898), Montenegrin commander, born in Njeguši
 Avram Cemović (1864–1914), commander of several rebels against Ottomans in the Lower Vasojevići region and military officer in the Army of Montenegro 
 Janko Vukotić (1866–1927), Montenegrin general, born in Čevo
 Pavle Đurišić (1909–1945), Chetnik commander, born in Podgorica
 Zaharije Ostojić (1907–1942), Chetnik commander, born in Bar
 Blagoje Jovović (1922–1999), Yugoslav Partisan, born in Danilovgrad

Politicians
Andrija Radović, Yugoslavian politician and statesmen
Lazar Tomanović
Milovan Đilas, Yugoslav politician and dissident
Branislav Šoškić, President of Montenegro
Borisav Jović, President of the Presidency of Yugoslavia
Branko Kostić, Yugoslav politician
Momir Bulatović, President of Montenegro and Prime Minister of FR Yugoslavia
Radovan Karadžić, Bosnian Serb politician, President of Republika Srpska
Radoman Božović, Prime Minister of Serbia
Žarko Obradović, Serbian politician, Minister of Education and Science
Zdravko Krivokapić,  Prime Minister of Montenegro
Andrija Mandić, President of the New Serb Democracy political party and former MP
Milan Knežević, President of the Democratic People's Party and MP
Srđan Milić
Marko Milačić
Vladislav Dajković
Vladimir Joković
Vladimir Dobričanin
Goran Danilović
Vladimir Leposavić

Artists
 Petar Lubarda, painter
 Milo Milunović, painter
 Risto Stijović, sculptor

Writers
Stefan Paštrović, writer
Marko Miljanov, writer
Petar II Petrović-Njegoš, poet
Borislav Pekić, Serbian writer,
Andrija Zmajević, baroque writer poet
Stefano Zannowich, writer and adventurer
Stjepan Mitrov Ljubiša, Serbian writer and politician
Marko Car, Serbian writer
Borislav Pekić, Serbian writer
Miodrag Bulatović, novelist and playwrigher
Matija Bećković, Serbian poet
Lazar Komarčić, Serbian SF writer
Branimir Šćepanović

Science and education
 Ljubomir Jovanović, historian and professor at the University of Belgrade
 Risto Kovačić, historian and teacher
 Vlado Strugar, historian
Vojislav Stanovčić, political scientists and theorists
Nikola Vukčević, Montenegrin historian
Aleksandar Stamatović, Montenegrin historian
Zoran Lakić, Montenegrin historian

Entertainment
Vlado Georgiev, Serbian singer
Marinko Madžgalj, Serbian actor and musician
Žarko Laušević, Serbian actor, born in Cetinje
Vesna Zmijanac, Serbian folk singer, born in Nikšić
Sanja Đorđević, Serbian folk singer, born in Pljevlja
Goga Sekulić, Serbian pop singer, born in Pljevlja
Niggor, Serbian hip-hop musician
Zoran Kalezić, Serbian folk singer, born in Danilovgrad

Sports

Žarko Varajić, basketball player,  Olympic silver medalist and European champion
Rajko Žižić, basketball player, European champion
Žarko Knežević, basketball player
Žarko Paspalj, basketball player, Olympic silver medalist, World and European champion
Aleksandar Pavlović, basketball player
Nikola Peković, basketball player
Predrag Savović, basketball player
Milica Dabović, basketball player, Olympic bronze medalist and European champion
Ana Dabović, basketball player, Olympic bronze medalist and European champion
Slobodan Marović, football player, European Cup champion
Duško Radinović, football player
Stefan Babović, football player
Milovan Jakšić, football player
Ljubomir Radanović, football player, Olympic bronze medalist
Dragoslav Jevrić, football player
Petar Škuletić, football player
Staniša Mandić, football player, World U-20 champion
Branko Štrbac, handball player, Olympic champion
Nenad Peruničić, handball player, bronze medalist at the European Championship
Ivan Nikčević, handball player, silver medalist at the European Championship
Darko Stanić, handball player, silver medalist at the European Championship
Mijajlo Marsenić, handball player
Katarina Bulatović, handball player, Olympic silver medalist and European champion
Ana Đokić, handball player, Olympic silver medalist and European champion
Bojana Popović, handball player, Olympic silver medalist 
Ana Radović, handball player, Olympic silver medalist 
Mirjana Milenković, handball player
Miloš Nikić, volleyball player, European champion
Silvija Popović, volleyball player,  Olympic silver medalist and European champion
Igor Kolaković, volleyball coach
Milorad Krivokapić, water polo player, Olympic champion
Andrija Prlainović, water polo player, Olympic, World and European champion
Dušan Mandić, water polo player, Olympic, World and European champion
Strahinja Jovančević, track and field
Aleksandar Pejanović, boxer
Nikola Sjekloća, boxer
Milos Raonic, Canadian tennis player, World No.4

Other
Božidar Vuković, printer
Vićenco Vuković, printer
Stevan Vukotić, the first Serb that sailed the world
Tomislav Karadžić, businessman and football administrator

See also
List of Serbs
List of Serbs of Bosnia and Herzegovina
List of Serbs of Croatia
List of Serbs of the Republic of Macedonia
List of Serbs of Slovenia
List of Serbs of Albania

References

List
Serbs of Montenegro
Montenegro